Jason Hill may refer to:

Jason Hill (golfer) (born 1971), American professional golfer
Jason Hill (American football) (born 1985), American football wide receiver
Jason Hill (singer) (active 1998 and after), American singer and producer
Jason Hill (rugby union) (born 1990), English-born Scottish rugby union player
Jason Hill (gardener), pseudonym under which the physicist Dr. Frank Anthony Hampton wrote gardening books, see Edward Augustus Bowles
Jason D. Hill, American professor of philosophy

See also 
 Hill (surname)